Reports and Transactions of the Cardiff Naturalists' Society was an annual scientific journal published by the Cardiff Naturalists' Society, containing scholarly articles on geology, archaeology, natural history, and meteorology, as well as book reviews and society notes.
The title started in 1867 and ceased publication in 1986. It is being digitized by the Welsh Journals Online project at the National Library of Wales. Scans of volumes 32 to 100 (1899–1986) are currently available.

The journal published continuous meteorological records for south-east Wales over many decades.

References

External links
 Journal page at the Welsh Journals Online resource at the National Library of Wales.

Geology journals
Archaeology journals
Meteorology journals
Magazines published in Wales
Multidisciplinary scientific journals
Publications established in 1867
Publications disestablished in 1986
English-language journals
Science and technology in Wales